Mohanpur Mohammadpur is a census town in Haridwar district in the Indian state of Uttarakhand.

Geography
It has an average elevation of 240 metres (787 feet).
It consists of two villages one is Mohammadpur inhabitant of Muslim Gada community, other is Mohanpura inhabitant of Hindu Gadariya (Pal) community.

Demographics
 India census, Mohanpur Mohammadpur had a population of 9300. Males constitute 52% of the population and females 48%. Mohanpur Mohammadpur has an average literacy rate of 71%, higher than the national average of 59.5%: male literacy is 75%, and female literacy is 59%. In Mohanpur Mohammadpur, 14% of the population is under 6 years of age.

References

Cities and towns in Haridwar district